Microtubule-associated monoxygenase, calponin and LIM domain containing 3, also known as MICAL3, is a human gene.

Function 
Along with two other Rab proteins, Rab6 and Rab8, MICAL3 work together in the process of docking and fusing of vesicles that are involved in exocytosis.

References

Further reading